Dubautia reticulata, the net-veined dubautia,  is a species of flowering plant in the family Asteraceae that is endemic to the island of Maui in Hawaii.  It is threatened by habitat loss.

References

IUCN Red List of Threatened Species — all species

reticulata
Endemic flora of Hawaii
Biota of Maui
Taxonomy articles created by Polbot